Viktor Petrovich Belov (born 23 January 1925 in Moscow; died 29 September 2001 in Moscow) was a Soviet Russian football player and coach.

Belov managed FC Metallurg Lipetsk in the Soviet First League and Soviet Second League from 1971 until 1974.

References

External links
 

1925 births
Footballers from Moscow
2001 deaths
Soviet footballers
PFC CSKA Moscow players
FC Spartak Moscow players
FC Fakel Voronezh players
Soviet football managers
FC Fakel Voronezh managers
FC Metallurg Lipetsk managers
FC Spartak Vladikavkaz managers
FC Sokol Saratov managers
Association football defenders
FC Torpedo NN Nizhny Novgorod players